Circle in the Dirt: El Pueblo de East Palo Alto is a 1995 play by Cherríe Moraga. It is set in East Palo Alto, California, a community in the San Francisco Bay Area. Circle in the Dirt and the 1996 play Watsonville were published together in a single book by the West End Press.

The story takes place on the day of a scheduled demolition of two buildings in East Palo Alto. As a result, it is the dissolution of a racially diverse community. In the play the characters discuss national events in the past and question the future.

The play, along with Watsonville, uses dialog that is a mixture of English and Spanish to paraphrase the content of the interviews conducted by Moraga; most of the actual interviews were done entirely in Spanish.

Characters
La Capitana - She is a Mexican Muwekma woman who discusses how Native Americans previously lived on what is now East Palo Alto and how the remains of her ancestors are housed at Stanford University. Lisa B. Thompson of the Theatre Journal wrote that she is "aging and ageless".
One African-American woman states that when her children were in integrated schools the children had academic improvement but were psychologically harmed.
An elderly white husband and wife
A 12-year-old female Samoan American
A middle-aged immigrant from Mexico

References
 Pareles, Marissa. "The Hungry Woman / Watsonville/Circle in the Dirt." (Queer Theater) Lambda Book Report, ISSN 1048-9487, 12/2003 (December 2003-January 2004), Volume 12, Issue 5/6, p. 43-44.
 Thompson, Lisa B. (State University of New York, Albany. "Watsonville/Circle in the Dirt (review)." Theatre Journal 56.3 (2004) 523-525. Available at Project MUSE. - DOI 10.1353/tj.2004.0130

Notes

Further reading
  Pignataro, Margarita Elena del Carmen (Arizona State University PhD thesis). "Religious hybridity and female power in "Heart of the Earth: A Popol Vuh Story" and other theatrical works by Cherrie Moraga." (Dissertation/Thesis). 01/2009, . UMI Number: 3353695. - This work has an abstract in English and is written in the Spanish language.

External links

 A Circle in the Dirt: El Puebol de East Palo Alto - Cherríe Moraga Official Website
 Watsonville / Circle in the Dirt - West End Press

1995 plays
Mexican-American literature
Hispanic and Latino American plays
San Mateo County, California
Plays set in California
Theatre in the San Francisco Bay Area
Plays by Cherríe Moraga